Carl Crabtree (born in California) is an American rancher and politician who served as a member of the Idaho Senate for the 7th district from 2016 to 2022.

Early life 
Crabtree was raised on a ranch in Kooskia and graduated from Clearwater Valley High School. In 1974, Crabtree earned a Bachelor of Science degree in plant science from the University of Idaho.

Career 
Crabtree is a rancher in Idaho. From 1974 to his retirement in 2015, he worked for Idaho County as 4-H program manager, as extension educator and weed supervisor. He continues to work in livestock production, having served in the Idaho Cattle Association, serving as president from 1991 to 1992, and on the Idaho Beef Council, serving as chairman from 2001 to 2002.

In 2016, Crabtree challenged eight-year incumbent Senator Sheryl Nuxoll in the Republican primary. Nuxoll gained national notoriety in 2015 for calling Hinduism "a false faith with false gods" and joining two other senators in skipping the invocation offered in the Senate by a guest Hindu chaplain. Crabtree narrowly defeated Nuxoll for the Republican nomination, and defeated Ken Meyers, a retired veterinary medicine professor from Sagle, in the general election.

Elections

Personal life 
Crabtree's wife is Carolyn Crabtree. Crabtree and his family live in Grangeville, Idaho.

References

External links 
 Carl G. Crabtree at ballotpedia.org
 crabtree4senate.com

Republican Party Idaho state senators
Living people
Ranchers from Idaho
People from Grangeville, Idaho
University of Idaho alumni
Year of birth missing (living people)
21st-century American politicians